Ginger Redmon is an American television soap opera writer.

Positions held
One Life to Live
 Script Writer (2003–2006)
 Continuity Supervisor (1999–2003)
 Assistant to the Executive Producer (1998)
 Intern (1998)

Awards and nominations
Daytime Emmy Award
Nomination, 2006, Best Writing, One Life to Live

Writers Guild of America Award
Nomination, 2003 and 2005, Best Writing, One Life to Live

External links

American soap opera writers
Year of birth missing (living people)
Living people
Place of birth missing (living people)